AFK Sistema PAO is a large Russian conglomerate company, founded by Vladimir Yevtushenkov, who was chairman of the corporation's board of directors until 2022. In April, Yevtushenkov's shareholding in Sistema has decreased to 49.2%, and he also stepped down from Sistema's board.

Sistema has its headquarters in Moscow. The company's global depository receipts (GDRs) are traded on the London Stock Exchange (ticker symbol ).

History
In 1993, Evgeny Novitsky and Vladimir Yevtushenkov founded the holding company AFK Sistema , also known as Sistema JSFC, to group together several information technology (IT) and cell phone companies including MTS.

Structure
Sistema operates a number of consumer service businesses in the areas of:
 IT and telecoms — Mobile TeleSystems, Moscow City Telephone Network, SkyLink, Sitronics (formerly known as 'Science Center Concern'), NIIME, Mikron, STROM telecom.
 Banking — MTS Bank
 E-commerce – Ozon
 House-Building and Real Estate — Sistema-Gals till the end of 2010. In February 2019, Sistema became the largest shareholder of Etalon Group
 Retail — Detsky Mir Group until September 2020
 Media — Sistema Mass Media until 2016
 Healthcare and Pharmaceuticals — Medsi, Binnopharm
 Agroholding - Steppe which, according to Forbes in June 2019, is the second largest land bank in Russia. It has holdings in Rostov Oblast and Stavropol Krai.
Segezha Group, a leading vertically integrated holding company in the timber industry performing a full cycle of operations from logging to advanced wood processing
Hospitality – Cosmos Hotel Group
Other businesses — Intourist (Travel Services), until July 2021 RTI Systems (Radio and space technology), Olympic Sistema (Sport)
Kronstadt Group until July 2021. In addition, in 07.27.2021 AO Kronstadt acquired 80% of the shares of NPP Strela (Research and Production Enterprise, Bykovo, Moscow Region), engaged in helicopter-type UAV work.
The corporation also invests in innovation projects, such as green hydrogen, and venture businesses.

In November 2021, “Sistema” was included in “Khabarovsky Project” (in Khabarovsk Krai) for pilot production of green hydrogen with projected 350 thousand tons per year, according to Ministry of Industry and Trade (Russia).

Interests and subsidiaries

Banking
In February 2005, AFK Sistema owned a 49% stake in East-West United Bank (Luxembourg), which was established in June 1974 as a "daughter" bank of the Central Bank of Russia and is one of the five Russian foreign banks of the VTB network. In 2018, Sistema held a 100% stake in East-West United Bank (EWUB) with Sergei Pchelintsev as the CEO.

Following the February and March 2022 sanctions issued against VTB and its subsidiaries which include the former daughter banks of the Soviet Union's State Bank Gosbank and later the Central Bank of Russia, EWUB in Luxembourg has become the principal Russian overseas bank in Europe after Gazprombank's liquidation. As of the end of March 2022, the Vladimir Yevtushenkov (в) controlled Sistema and its subsidiary East-West United Bank (EWUB) in Luxembourg have not been sanctioned due to Russian invasion of Ukraine. He is no longer controls Sistema after reducing his stake in the Corporation below control (49.2%), and voluntary resignation from its board of directors in April 2022.

Hotels
According to Arnold Tamm (Spivakovsky), both the Peking Hotel at Bol'shaya Sadovaya Ulitsa, 5 in Moscow, where Oleg Kuznetsov was the administrator from 2002 to 2016, and the Cosmos Hotel at 150 Mira Avenue in Moscow, are owned by Sistema.

Aerospace and defence
Until July 2021 AFK Sistema PAO had an aerospace and defence subsidiary, Kronstadt Group, which was acquired in 2015 and developed unmanned aerial vehicles, and flight simulators. AFK Sistema no longer controls any assets related to the defense industry.

Bashneft interest seizure and Rosneft lawsuit
In 2014, 72% of Sistema's interest in Bashneft was seized by the Russian government.

On May 3, 2017, Sistema shares plunged about 37% following a $1.9 billion lawsuit filed by Rosneft.

On 15 May 2017, the Arbitration Court of Bashkortostan registered a RUB 106.6bn claim filed by Rosneft and Bashneft against Sistema, a preliminary hearing of the case was scheduled for 6 June, Irina Nurislamova was appointed as a judge for the case.

In December 2017, AFK Sistema reached an amicable agreement with Rosneft and agreed to pay out 100 billion roubles ($1.7 billion) to resolve the dispute.

According to a declaration given on 18 October 2018 in Spanish court by Sergey Dozhdev, Igor Sechin uses his offshore companies to control Sistema through MTS and Bashneft.

Management
On 27 June 2020, Etienne Schneider became an independent director of Sistema at which his close political friend Jeannot Krecké has been a director at Sistema since May 2012.

Notes

References

External links

 Sistema website
 Google Finance: Sistema

 
Conglomerate companies of Russia
Companies based in Moscow
Companies established in 1993
Holding companies established in 1993
1993 establishments in Russia
Companies listed on the Moscow Exchange
Companies listed on the London Stock Exchange